David Sinclair (born 24 November 1947) is a British keyboardist (organ, piano, harpsichord, electric piano, Mellotron, Davolisint, etc.) associated with the psychedelia/progressive rock Canterbury Scene since the late 1960s. He became famous with the band Caravan and was responsible as a songwriter for creating some of their best-known tracks: "For Richard", "Nine Feet Underground", "The Dabsong Conshirtoe", "Proper Job/Back to Front".

Biography
Sinclair was born in  Herne Bay, Kent, England. Having started his musical career 1966–67 with the Wilde Flowers, he founded Caravan in 1968 with his cousin Richard Sinclair (bass/vocals), Pye Hastings (guitar/vocals), and Richard Coughlan (drums) and was in and out of the band for 35 years (so far 1968–71, 1973–75, 1979–82, 1990–2002). Over the course of Caravan's first three albums he developed his playing enormously on his favoured model of Hammond organ, the A100 (similar in configuration and features to the B3 and C3 models, but slightly smaller in overall bulk), culminating in his soaring work on what is perhaps their most celebrated album, In the Land of Grey and Pink (1971). Calyx, The Canterbury Website, compiled by the French music expert Aymeric Leroy, refers to him as "master of the typical Canterbury organ sound/playing". However, from the second album onwards, he also added other keyboards to his palette, including piano, harpsichord and Mellotron. On his return to Caravan for their fifth album, For Girls Who Grow Plump in the Night, he pioneered the Davolisint.

In between his stints with Caravan, he was a member of Matching Mole (1971–72), Hatfield and the North (1972–73), Polite Force (1976–77) and Camel (1978–1979).

In the early 2000s he released two solo albums, Full Circle and Into the Sun (both 2003). Since then, he has been engaged in a solo career, including concert appearances in Japan and England. A 30th anniversary re-release of his Moon Over Man album (originally issued on CD by Voiceprint in 1993) appeared in 2006.  Like the earlier Voiceprint release, this consisted of demos for an unreleased solo album recorded 1976–77, featuring contributions from vocalists Tim Lynk and Gay Perez; however, the sound quality of the old analogue tapes was greatly improved and bonus tracks from the same sessions were added.

He moved to Kyoto, Japan in 2005. Since 2016, he lives in Yuge Island of Kamijima in the Seto Inland Sea.

Two solo albums, PianoWorks1 – Frozen in Time and Stream (the latter featuring several distinguished guest artists) were released in 2010 and 2011 respectively; licensing problems have so far prevented Stream from being officially issued outside Japan, although it has recently become available in other territories. The Little Things, intended as a follow-up to Stream, was released in 2013, the Japanese version being slightly different in packaging and content from the international version.

In May 2015 a series of well-received concert dates with saxophonist Jimmy Hastings took place in Japan.

Dave Sinclair's most recent solo album, Out of Sinc, was released in June 2018. He is currently working on a new album, to be released later in 2021.

Discography
Solo 
1993 – Moon Over Man (Voiceprint VP119CD)
2003 – Full Circle (DSincs-Music 001)
2003 – Into the Sun (DSincs-Music 002)
2010 – Pianoworks I – Frozen in Time (CRSCNT 001)
2011 – Stream (CRSCNT 002)
2014 – The Little Things (DSincs-Music)
2018 – Out of Sinc (DSincs-Music)

Caravan
1968 – Caravan (Verve VLP 6011 now released on HTD Records as HTDCD 65)
1970 – If I Could Do It All Over Again I'd Do It All Over You (Decca SKL-R 5052)
1971 – In the Land of Grey and Pink (Deram SDL-R 1)
1973 – For Girls Who Grow Plump in the Night (Deram SKL-R 12)
1974 – Caravan and the New Symphonia (Decca SKL-R 1110)
1975 – Cunning Stunts (Deram SKL-R 5210)
1980 – The Album (Kingdom KVL 9003)
1980 – The Best of Caravan Live (Kingdom 426002)
1982 – Back to Front (Kingdom KVL 5011)
1993 – Live (Demon Code90 NINETY 2 )
1995 – The Battle of Hastings (HTD Records HTDCD 41)
1996 – All Over You (HTD Records HTDCD 57)
1997 – Live from the Astoria (HTD Records HTDCD 79)
1998 – Back on the Tracks (CoCaCamp act001)
1999 – All Over You Too (HTD Records HTDCD 102)
2004 – The Unauthorized Breakfast Item (on 2 tracks) (Eclectic Discs ECL 1001)

Camel
1978 – Breathless (Deram 820 726-2)

Robert Wyatt
1970 – The End of an Ear (CBS 64189)

Matching Mole
1972 – Matching Mole (CBS 64850)

Richard Sinclair's Caravan of Dreams
1992 – Richard Sinclair's Caravan of Dreams (HTD CD7)
1993 – An Evening of Magic (HTD CD 17)

Polite Force 
1997 – Canterbury Knights (Voiceprint VP187)

Filmography
 2015: Romantic Warriors III: Canterbury Tales (DVD)

References

Dave's homepage
David Sinclair at Calyx, The Canterbury Website
www.caravan-info.co.uk Caravan Information Service – Official Caravan Website
Dave Sinclair Video Gallery

External links
Dave Sinclair, Japanese Official Website
Collapso – Canterbury Music Family Tree

Canterbury scene
English pianists
English keyboardists
People from Herne Bay, Kent
1947 births
Living people
Caravan (band) members
Camel (band) members
Musicians from Kent
Matching Mole members
The Wilde Flowers members
Hatfield and the North members
Progressive rock keyboardists